Marat Aleksanian (3 August 1949 – 19 April 2020) was an Armenian politician and lawyer who served as Minister of Justice from 1996 to 1998. He graduated from Yerevan State University in 1971.

Aleksanian died on April 19, 2020 after a long illness.

References

External links
Parliamentary website

1949 births
2020 deaths
People from Abovyan
Armenian Ministers of Justice
Yerevan State University alumni
Government ministers of Armenia